Boreoclytocerus ocellaris is a species of fly in the family Psychodidae. It is found in the  Palearctic .

References

Psychodidae
Insects described in 1818